Noel Morgan may refer to:
Noel Morgan (cricketer) (1905–1975), Welsh cricketer
Noel Morgan (rugby league) (born 1940), Australian rugby league footballer